Peski is a rural locality (a settlement) in Sovkhozskoye Rural Settlement, Nikolayevsky District, Volgograd Oblast, Russia. The population was 14 as of 2010.

Geography 
Peski is located 45 km east of Nikolayevsk (the district's administrative centre) by road. Krasny Meliorator is the nearest rural locality.

References 

Rural localities in Nikolayevsky District, Volgograd Oblast